William Kirker (30 January 1866 – 27 February 1942) was a New Zealand cricketer. He played in three first-class matches for Wellington from 1887 to 1894.

See also
 List of Wellington representative cricketers

References

External links
 

1866 births
1942 deaths
New Zealand cricketers
Wellington cricketers
Cricketers from Christchurch